Alaa El-Din Abdul Moneim (born January 3, 1951, in New Helmia, Al-Darb Al Ahmar, Cairo, Egypt) is an independent member of the Egyptian Parliament and a lawyer. Alaa El-Din is known for his active role exposing corruption  in Egypt, primarily during the Mubarak era.

Early life
Alaa graduated from the Police Academy and served in the Police Department in Egypt for two years before retiring and engaging a position in a law firm in Kuwait. After seven years in Kuwait, Alaa returned to Egypt and started his own law firm.

Parliament membership
In 2005, Alaa decided to run for a seat in the Parliament of Egypt with the aim of bringing corruption issues to public attention. After five years of preparation, Alaa won his seat after re-election against a National Democratic Party nominee.

Alaa brought to public attention a number of controversial corruption cases which he had supported with credible evidence.

See also
 Parliament of Egypt
 National Democratic Party (Egypt)

References

External links
 Official website
 National Democratic Party

1951 births
Living people
Members of the House of Representatives (Egypt)